Balonmano Altea was a handball team based in Altea, Alicante, Spain. The last season, (2007–08) the team played in  1ª Nacional.

History
Founded in September 1974. The Balonmano Altea has teams in all categories of Spanish Handball. The President of the Balonmano Altea from season 96/97 is Mr. Paschal Moragues, who already I had this position from season 74/75 to 86/87. Paschal Moragues was the first President of the BM Altea. In season 96/97 the team win the promotion to the Liga ASOBAL (Asobal League) when winning in the Playoff to the BM Barakaldo. In season 98/99 the team is relegated to the First Division of División de Honor B, where remained one year, after promote again to the Asobal League in season 1999/00, category where stay yet in the 2006/2007 season.
On 11 August 2007, the club was relegated to 1ª Nacional due to financial irregularities.
At the end of the 2007–2008 season, BM Altea definitely was dissolved.

Trophies
EHF Cup
Semifinal:2002-03
Runners-Up: 2003-04
King Cup
Semifinal: 2001-02, 2002-03.
Asobal League positions
2000-01: 10th
2001-02: 5th
2002-03: 4th
2003-04: 6th
2004-05: 9th
2005-06: 14th
2006-07: 12th

Statistics 2006/07

Goals:
Rune Ohm - 152 goals
Ivan Nikčević - 132 goals
Alexandar Buchmann - 96 goals
Catches:
Rade Mijatović - 205 catches 29%
Jorge Oliva Domínguez - 138 catches 29%

Notable players
 Ivan Nikčević
 Ratko Nikolić
 Vladimir Mandić
 Rade Mijatović

Stadium information
Name: - Polideportivo Garganes
City: - Altea
Capacity: - 1,200 spectators
Address: - C/ Partida Garganes, s/n

References

External links
BM Altea Official Site 
 Documentacion para entrenadores de Balonmano
 Revista digital de la Liga Asobal Balonmano

Spanish handball clubs
Sports teams in the Valencian Community
Defunct handball clubs
Handball clubs established in 1974
Sports clubs disestablished in 2008
1974 establishments in Spain
2008 disestablishments in Spain